Vladimir Leontyevich Komarov (– 5 December 1945) was a Russian and Soviet botanist.

Biography
Komarov was born in 1869. He was a graduate of St. Petersburg University where he received a degree in botany in 1894. He worked as a professor at the university in the period 1898–1934.

Until his death in 1945, he was senior editor of the Flora SSSR (Flora of the U.S.S.R.), in full comprising 30 volumes published between 1934 and 1960. He was elected a corresponding member of the Russian Academy of Sciences in 1914 and its full member in 1920. He served as President of the Academy of Sciences of the USSR in 1936–1945. He was a deputy at the Supreme Soviet from 1938 to 1945.

Awards and legacy
Komarov was awarded the Stalin Prize in 1941 and 1942 and the Hero of Socialist Labour in 1943.

The Komarov Botanical Institute and its associated Komarov Botanical Garden in Saint Petersburg are named after him.

In 1939, botanist Evgenii (Yevgeni, Eugeny) Petrovich Korovin (1891-1963), published a genus of flowering plants (in the family Apiaceae), from Uzbekistan, as Komarovia  in his honour (a name since replaced by Komaroviopsis).

List of selected publications

 Coniferae of Manchuria. Trudy Imp. S.Peterburgsk. Obsc. 32: 230-241 (1902).
 De Gymnospermis nonnullis Asiaticis I, II. Bot. Mater. Gerb. Glavn. Bot. Sada RSFSR 4: 177–181, 5: 25-32 (1923–1924).
 Florae peninsulae Kamtschatka (1927).

References

External links

1869 births
1945 deaths
Saint Petersburg State University alumni
People from Saint Petersburg Governorate
Botanists active in Siberia
Botanists with author abbreviations
Corresponding members of the Saint Petersburg Academy of Sciences
Full Members of the Russian Academy of Sciences (1917–1925)
Presidents of the USSR Academy of Sciences
Foreign Members of the Bulgarian Academy of Sciences
20th-century Russian botanists
Soviet botanists
Burials at Novodevichy Cemetery
Members of the Supreme Soviet of Russia
Heroes of Socialist Labour
Recipients of the USSR State Prize